Elisabeth Johanna Koning (1 March 1816 – 25 June 1887) was a Dutch still life painter.

Biography
Koning was born in Haarlem and was a pupil of Henriette Ronner-Knip. She was something of a child prodigy and at age 9 was honored by having her animal drawings on show at the 1825 Tentoonstelling Nationale Nijverheid (National Industrial show) in Haarlem. In 1844 she was made honorary member of Kunst zij ons doel and a year later she was named member of the Koninklijke Academie van Beeldende Kunsten in Amsterdam. In 1859 she married the ship captain Sybrand Stapert and accompanied him on a trip to Indonesia, and her drawings of sea life from this trip granted her an honorary membership in the Naturalist's club of Indonesia, but the couple returned to the Netherlands later the same year and settled in Groningen. After her marriage she signed works "EJS geb. K" (short for Elisabeth Johanna Stapert, born Koning). Her Indonesian botanical work is often seen as her most important legacy, but her flower paintings were awarded prizes and purchased by public collections in her lifetime.

Koning died in Rotterdam. Since she was active in international shows from an early age and married late in life, she is better known under her maiden name.

References	
	
Elisabeth Johanna Koning in the Digitaal Vrouwenlexicon van Nederland

External links

Elisabeth Johanna Koning on Artnet	

1816 births
1887 deaths
Painters from Haarlem
Dutch women painters
Flower artists
19th-century Dutch women artists
19th-century Dutch painters